John Tribby (October 30, 1903 – February 1983) was an American sound engineer. He was nominated for an Academy Award in the category Sound Recording for the film The Case of Sergeant Grischa.

Selected filmography
 The Case of Sergeant Grischa (1930)

References

External links

1903 births
1983 deaths
American audio engineers
People from Marshall County, Indiana
20th-century American engineers